Maisie Goes to Reno is the eighth film starring Ann Sothern as Maisie Ravier, preceded by Swing Shift Maisie and followed by Up Goes Maisie. John Hodiak plays her love interest in this 1944 romantic comedy.

Plot
Overworked World War II riveter Maisie Ravier becomes irritable and starts involuntarily winking at people, so the factory's doctor prescribes a two-week vacation with pay. She runs into her friend and bandleader Tommy Cutter, who wants her to sing for two weeks in Reno.

When she goes to the bus station, she encounters Sergeant Bill Fullerton, who is also going to Reno. He wants to stop his wealthy wife, Gloria, from divorcing him. When his leave is canceled because his unit is relocating, he begs Maisie to deliver a letter to Gloria in person.

In Reno, blackjack dealer "Flip" Hennahan knows where Gloria is staying and drives Maisie to the isolated resort. However, Maisie is fooled into believing that Gloria's private secretary, "Wini" Ashbourne, is Gloria. Wini and Gloria's business manager, Roger Pelham, want the divorce to go through for their own (never explained) reasons. They get J. E. Clave to forge another letter to give Gloria the impression that Bill only married her for her money.

In between her blossoming romance with Flip, Maisie discovers she has been duped and sets out to get evidence to convince Gloria that she is being manipulated. She obtains a blotter on which Clave practiced his forgery, but Clave finds out and the crooked trio retrieve the evidence and burn it. Meanwhile, the confused Flip starts thinking that Maisie is having a nervous breakdown.

When Bill telephones Maisie, she strongly urges him to come to Reno before it is too late. Meanwhile, she enlists love-smitten hotel bellboy Jerry into helping kidnap Gloria. She gets caught, but Flip convinces the police that Maisie is not in her right mind and has her released into his custody. When Bill shows up, however, Maisie rushes off with him to the courthouse, where husband and wife are reunited and everything is sorted out.

Cast

References

External links
 
 
 
 

American romantic comedy films
American black-and-white films
Films directed by Harry Beaumont
Films scored by Lennie Hayton
Films scored by Bronisław Kaper
Films set in Reno, Nevada
Metro-Goldwyn-Mayer films
1944 romantic comedy films
1944 films
1940s American films
1940s English-language films